Canossa is a residential neighbourhood in the Castledowns area of north Edmonton, Alberta, Canada.  As with all north end neighbourhoods, its location makes it an attractive place for people who work on CFB Edmonton, but choose to live off base.

Canossa is a newer neighbourhood.  According to the 2001 federal census, all residential construction in the neighbourhood occurred after 1990, with two-thirds of the construction being completed during the second half of the decade.

According to the 2005 municipal census, the most common type of residence in the neighbourhood is the single-family dwelling.  These make up 84% of all the residences in the neighbourhood.  The remaining residences are duplexes (11%) and row houses (5%).  Substantially all residences (97%) are owner-occupied.

Demographics 

The average household income in Canossa is significantly higher than the average household income for the City of Edmonton.

It is bounded on the east by 112 Street, on the south by 167 Avenue, on the west by a north-south line half a block west of 119 Street, and on the north by rural farmland.

Surrounding neighbourhoods

References

External links 
 Canossa Neighbourhood Profile
 Canossa Demographic Profile

Neighbourhoods in Edmonton